The Jew's harp, also known as jaw harp, juice harp, or mouth harp, is a lamellophone instrument, consisting of a flexible metal or bamboo tongue or reed attached to a frame. Contrary to the colloquial name, the Jew's harp most likely originated in Siberia, specifically in or around the Altai Mountains and has no relation to the Jewish people.

Jew's harps may be categorized as idioglot or heteroglot (whether or not the frame and the tine are one piece); by the shape of the frame (rod or plaque); by the number of tines, and whether the tines are plucked, joint-tapped, or string-pulled.

Characteristics
The frame is held firmly against the performer's parted teeth or lips (depending on the type), using the mouth as a resonator, greatly increasing the volume of the instrument. The teeth must be parted sufficiently for the reed to vibrate freely, and the fleshy parts of the mouth should not come into contact with the reed to prevent damping of the vibrations and possible pain. The note or tone thus produced is constant in pitch, though by changing the shape of the mouth, and the amount of air contained in it (and in some traditions closing the glottis), the performer can cause different overtones to sound and thus create melodies.

According to the Encyclopædia Britannica Eleventh Edition, "The vibrations of the steel tongue produce a compound sound composed of a fundamental and its harmonics. By using the cavity of the mouth as a resonator, each harmonic in succession can be isolated and reinforced, giving the instrument the compass shown."

"The lower harmonics of the series cannot be obtained, owing to the limited capacity of the resonating cavity. The black notes on the stave show the scale which may be produced by using two harps, one tuned a fourth above the other. The player on the Jew's harp, in order to isolate the harmonics, frames his mouth as though intending to pronounce the various vowels." See: bugle scale.

History

The earliest depiction of somebody playing what seems to be a Jew's harp is a Chinese drawing from the 3rd century BCE, and curved bones discovered in the Shimao fortifications in Shaanxi, China are believed to be the earliest evidence of its existence, dating back to before 1800 BCE. Archaeological finds of surviving examples in Europe have been claimed to be almost as old, but those dates have been challenged both on the grounds of excavation techniques, and the lack of contemporary writing or pictures mentioning the instrument.

Etymology
There are many theories for the origin of the name jew's harp. The apparent reference to Jewish people, is especially misleading since it "has nothing to do with the Jewish people; neither does it look like a harp in its structure and appearance". The name, "Jew's Harp" first appears in 1481 in a customs account book under the name, "Jue harpes". The "jaw" variant is attested at least as early as 1774 and 1809, the "juice" variant appeared only in the late 19th and 20th centuries.

It has also been suggested that the name derives from the French  meaning 'toy trumpet'. Wedgwood, an English etymologist, wrote in 1855 that the derivation from  opposes the French idiom, where "if two substantives are joined together, the qualifying noun is invariably the last. He refers to the  derivation, but not to the  derivation.

Both theories—that the name is a corruption of jaws or —are described by the OED as "lacking any supporting evidence." The OED says that, "more or less satisfactory reasons may be conjectured: e.g. that the instrument was actually made, sold, or imported to England by Jewish people, or purported to be so; or that it was attributed to Jewish people, suggesting the trumps and harps mentioned in the Bible, and hence considered a good commercial name." The OED also states that "the association of the instrument with Jewish people occurs, so far as is known, only in English." However, the term is also used in Danish as jødeharpe.

Manufacture

Manufacture of Indian morchang 
Indian morchangs are made in many metals but mainly in brass, iron, copper and silver. Different types of construction art are used for the construction of Morchang in each metal.

Brass 

Brass murchangs are manufactured from ancient Indian manufacturing style brass metal casting. Brass molding is a process of shaping brass, into desired shapes using a mold. The brass is heated to a molten state and then poured or forced into the mold, where it cools and solidifies into the desired shape. Brass molding is often used to create intricate or complex shapes.

Use

Cambodian music

The angkouch is a Cambodian Jew's harp. It is a folk instrument made of bamboo and carved into a long, flat shape with a hole in the center and the tongue across the hole. There is also a metal variety, more round or tree-leaf shaped. It may also have metal bells attached. The instrument is both a wind instrument and percussion instrument. As a wind instrument, it is placed against the mouth, which acts as a resonator and tool to alter the sound. Although mainly a folk instrument, better-made examples exist. While the instrument was thought to be the invention of children herding cattle, it is sometimes used in public performance, to accompany the Mahori music in public dancing.

Indian Classical music
The instrument is used as part of the rhythm section in various styles of Indian folk and classical music. Most notably the Morsing in the Carnatic music of South India, or the Morchang in the lok geet (folk music) of Rajasthan.

Nepali tradition

Murchunga

It is very similar to an Indian morsing or morchang in that the tongue (or twanger) extends beyond the frame, thus giving the instrument more sustain.

Binayo
The  (Nepali ) is a bamboo Jew's harp, in the Kiranti musical tradition from Malingo. It is popular in the Eastern Himalayan region of Sikkim, Darjeeling Nepal and Bhutan. It is a wind instrument played by blowing the air without tuning the node with fingers. The  is six inches long and one inch in width.

Turkic traditional music

Kyrgyz music
The temir komuz is made of iron, usually with a length of 100–200 mm and with a width of approximately 2–7 mm. The range of the instrument varies with the size of the instrument but generally hovers around an octave span. The Kyrgyz people are exceptionally proficient on the instrument and it is quite popular among children, although some adults continue to play the instrument. A national artist from the Kyrgyz Republic performs on the instrument. Twenty Kyrgyz girls have played in a temir komuz ensemble on the stage of the Bolshoi Theater in Moscow. Temir komuz pieces were notated by Aleksandr Zataevich in two or three parts. An octave drone is possible, or even an ostinato alternating the fifth step of a scale with an octave.

Turkish music 
In Turkish, the Jew's harp is called as ağız kopuzu. The Jew's harp traditionally used in Turkish folk songs from Anatolia has fallen out of use with time. Modern renditions of Turkish folk songs with the Jew's harp have been done by artists such as Senem Diyici in the song 'Dolama Dolamayı' and Ravan Yuzkhan.

Sindhi music
In Sindhi the Jew's harp is called . In Sindhi music, it can be an accompaniment or the main instrument. One of the most famous players is Amir Bux Ruunjho.

Sicilian music
In Sicily, the Jew's harp is commonly known as marranzanu, but other names include angalarruni, calarruni, gangalarruni, ganghilarruni, mariolu, mariolu di fera, marranzana, and ngannalarruni.

Austrian Jew's harp playing
Austrian Jew's harp music uses typical Western harmony. The UNESCO has included Austrian Jew's harp playing in its Intangible Cultural Heritage list.

Western classical music
Early representations of Jew's harps have appeared in Western churches since the fourteenth century.

The Austrian composer Johann Albrechtsberger—chiefly known today as a teacher of Beethoven—wrote seven concerti for Jew's harp, mandora, and orchestra between 1769 and 1771. Four of them have survived, in the keys of F major, E-flat major, E major, and D major. They are based on the special use of the Jew's harp in Austrian folk music.

Well known performer Franz Koch (1761–1831), discovered by Frederick the Great, could play two Jew's harps at once, while the also well known performer Karl Eulenstein (1802—1890), "invented a system of playing four at once, connecting them by silken strings in such a way that he could clasp all four with the lips, and strike all the four springs at the same time".

The American composer Charles Ives wrote a part for Jew's harp in the Washington's Birthday movement of A Symphony: New England Holidays.

Western music

The Jew's harp has been used occasionally in rock and country music. For example:
 Canned Heat's multi-part piece "Parthenogenesis" from their Living the Blues album.
 The Who – "Join Together"
 The Ozark Mountain Daredevils – "Chicken Train"
 Neil Young – "Get Back to the Country"
 The Beach Boys – "Steamboat"
 Eric Clapton – "San Francisco Bay Blues"
 Billy Joel – "Travelin' Prayer"
 Mason Proffit – "Voice of Change"
 Gojira – "Amazonia"
 Red Hot Chili Peppers — “Give It Away”
 Big Thief — “Spud Infinity”
 Black Sabbath - "Sleeping Village"
 The Beatles - “The Fool on the Hill”
 Billy Strings - "Livin' Like An Animal"

See also
Jew's harp music
Berimbau
Đàn môi, another kind of Jew's harp from Vietnam
Gogona, a similar instrument played by Assamese people (especially women) while singing and dancing Bihu
Karinding
Kouxian, the Chinese version
Kubing, a bamboo Jew's harp from the Philippines
Morsing, Carnatic Jew's harp
Mukkuri, a traditional bamboo instrument of the Ainu of Japan, similar to a Jew's harp
Music of Central Asia
Traditional music of Sicily
Musical bow, a one-string harp that is played with mouth resonance
Piperheugh, a village in which trumps were once made
Karinding, a Sundanese traditional musical instrument from West Java and Banten, Indonesia

Notes

References

Citations

General and cited references 

 Alekseev, Ivan, and E. I. [i.e. Egor Innokent'evich] Okoneshnikov (1988). Iskusstvo igry na iakutskom khomuse. IAkutsk: Akademiia nauk SSSR, Sibirskoe otd-nie, IAkutskii filial, In-t iazyka, lit-ry i istorii.
 Bakx, Phons (1992). De gedachtenverdrijver: de historie van de mondharp. Hadewijch wereldmuziek. Antwerpen: Hadewijch; .
 Boone, Hubert, and René de Maeyer (1986). De Mondtrom. Volksmuziekinstrumenten in Belgie en in Nederland. Brussel: La Renaissance du Livre.
 Crane, Frederick (1982). "Jew's (jaw's? jeu? jeugd? gewgaw? juice?) harp." In: Vierundzwanzigsteljahrschrift der Internationalen Maultrommelvirtuosengenossenschaft, vol. 1 (1982). With: "The Jew's Harp in Colonial America," by Brian L. Mihura.
 Crane, Frederick (2003). A History of the Trump in Pictures: Europe and America. A special supplement to Vierundzwanzigsteljahrsschrift der Internationalen Maultrommelvirtuosengenossenschaft. Mount Pleasant, Iowa: [Frederick Crane].
 Dournon-Taurelle, Geneviève, and John Wright (1978). Les Guimbardes du Musée de l'homme. Preface by Gilbert Rouget. Published by the Muséum national d'histoire naturelle and l'Institut d'ethnologie.
 Emsheimer, Ernst (1941). "Über das Vorkommen und die Anwendungsart der Maultrommel in Sibirien und Zentralasien". In: Ethnos (Stockholm), nos 3–4 (1941).
 Emsheimer, Ernst (1964). "Maultrommeln in Sibirien und Zentralasien." In: Studia ethnomusicologica eurasiatica (Stockholm: Musikhistoriska museet, pp. 13–27).
 Fox, Leonard (1984). The Jew's Harp: A Comprehensive Anthology. Selected, edited, and translated by Leonard Fox. Charleston, South Carolina: L. Fox.
 Fox, Leonard (1988). The Jew's Harp: A Comprehensive Anthology. Selected, edited, and translated by Leonard Fox. Lewisburg: Bucknell University Press; London: Associated University Presses; .
 Gallmann, Matthew S. (1977). The Jews Harp: A Select List of References With Library of Congress Call Numbers. Washington, D.C.: Library of Congress, Archive of Folk Song.
 Gotovtsev, Innokenty. New Technologies for Yakut Khomus. Yakutsk.
 Kolltveit, Gjermund (2006). Jew's Harps in European Archaeology. BAR International series, 1500. Oxford: Archaeopress; .
 Mercurio, Paolo (1998). Sa Trumba. Armomia tra telarzu e limbeddhu. Solinas Edition, Nuoro (IT).
 Plate, Regina (1992). Kulturgeschichte der Maultrommel. Orpheus-Schriftenreihe zu Grundfragen der Musik, Bd. 64. Bonn: Verlag für Systematische Musikwissenschaft; .
 Mercurio, Paolo (2013). Gli Scacciapensieri Strumenti Musicali dell'Armonia Internazionali, Interculturali, Interdisciplinari. Milano; .
 
 Shishigin, S. S. (1994). Igraite na khomuse. Mezhdunarodnyi tsentr khomusnoi (vargannoi) muzyki. Pokrovsk: S.S. Shishigin/Ministerstvo kul'tury Respubliki Sakha (IAkutiia). .
 Shishigin, Spiridon. Kulakovsky and Khomus. Yakutia.
 Smeck, Roy (1974). Mel Bay's Fun With the Jaws Harp. 
 Wright, Michael (2008). "The Jew's Harp in the Law, 1590–1825". Folk Music Journal 9.3 pp. 349–371; ISSN 0531-9684. .
 Wright, Michael (2015). The Jew's Harp in Britain and Ireland. Farnham, Surrey: Ashgate; .
 Yuan, Bingchang, and Jizeng Mao (1986). Zhongguo Shao Shu Min Zu Yue Qi Zhi. Beijing: Xin Shi Jie Chu Ban She: Xin Hua Shu Dian Beijing Fa Xing Suo Fa Xing; .

External links

The Jew's Harp Guild
How to play and make jew's harp
How to play the jew's harp (instructions with sound examples and remarks on the functioning of Jew's harps)
A page on guimbardes from Pat Missin's free reed instrument website
Demir-xomus (Tuvan Jew's Harp) Demos, photos, folktale, and text

Early musical instruments
Heteroglot guimbardes and jaw harps
Appalachian culture
Chinese musical instruments
Turkic culture